"If You Are But a Dream" is a popular song published in 1942 with words and music by Moe Jaffe, Jack Fulton and Nat Bonx. The melody is based on Anton Rubinstein's "Romance in E flat, Op. 44, No. 1," popularly known as "Rubinstein's Romance".

The song is most closely associated with Frank Sinatra, who recorded it first for Columbia Records on November 14, 1944, with an arrangement by Axel Stordahl. This recording was on the reverse side of a 78 rpm record with "White Christmas", and consequently did very well with "White Christmas" reaching the No. 7 spot in the Billboard charts. "If You Are But a Dream" itself briefly reached the Billboard charts in the No. 19 position. A year later, in 1945, "If You Are But a Dream" was included in the Academy Award-winning short film, The House I Live In, in which Sinatra was featured.

Sinatra recorded this song again for Capitol Records on December 11, 1957, with an arrangement by Nelson Riddle. This recording was first released on the LP This Is Sinatra Volume 2 (Capitol 982).  Both the Columbia and Capitol versions have subsequently been reissued on a number of CDs.

"If You Are But a Dream" was featured most prominently in Woody Allen's 1987 film, Radio Days, which features the 1944 recording on the soundtrack.

There is also another song based on the same Rubenstein work.  It was written by Al Kasha and Hank Hunter and was called "Forever and a Day".    It was recorded by Jackie Wilson for his 1963 LP,  Jackie Wilson – Sings The World's Greatest Melodies.

"If You Are But a Dream" was also recorded by a number of other artists.
 
These include (among others):
  
Brook Benton - for his album Songs I Love to Sing (1960).
Vic Damone - Why Can't I Walk Away (1968).
Sammy Davis, Jr. - The Sammy Davis Jr. All-Star Spectacular (1962)
The Delta Rhythm Boys - for the album Dry Bones (1952).
Jimmy Dorsey and His Orchestra (vocal by Bob Eberly) - this briefly reached the Billboard charts in 1942 in the No. 20 position.
Nelson Eddy - for his album A Starry Night (1960).
Duke Ellington
Robert Goulet - Always You (1962).
Screamin' Jay Hawkins - At Home with Screamin' Jay Hawkins (1958).
Etta Jones - Lonely and Blue (1962)
Carol Kidd - A Place in My Heart (1999).
Mario Lanza - If You Are But a Dream - Radio Performances Never Before Released (1965).
Elliot Lawrence Orchestra
Liberace - Piano by Starlight (1958).
Gerry Mulligan
Harve Presnell - The World's Greatest Love Songs (1964).
Ray Price
Roy Hamilton - a single release in 1955.
Della Reese - The Classic Della (1962)
Sonny Stitt
Sarah Vaughan - Close to You (1960)
Teddy Wilson - The Touch of Teddy Wilson (1957)

References

1942 songs
Songs written by Moe Jaffe
Songs written by Jack Fulton